The Magellanic Premium, also known as the Magellanic Gold Medal and Magellanic Prize is awarded for major contributions in the field of navigation (whether by sea, air, or in space), astronomy, or natural philosophy.

The Premium was established in 1786 through a grant by Jean-Hyacinthe Magellan. Benjamin Franklin, then President of the American Philosophical Society, accepted it and established the terms of reference under which it would be given.

In the 217 years since Magellan offered the Premium, the APS has awarded on only 36 occasions (as of 2021): twelve for navigation, twelve for natural philosophy, and eleven for astronomy.

Recipients of the Magellanic Premium 
Source: American Philosophical Society

See also 

 List of general science and technology awards

References 

 The Magellanic Premium

Science and technology awards
1786 establishments in England